The Patriots–Ravens rivalry is a National Football League (NFL) rivalry between the New England Patriots and the Baltimore Ravens. Though the two franchises are in different divisions within the American Football Conference and did not start playing each other until the late 1990s, their rivalry is noted for competitiveness in the playoffs, especially in the late 2000s and early 2010s.

History
The two teams first played each other in 1996, but the rivalry started in earnest in 2007 when the Ravens suffered a bitter 27–24 loss in the Patriots' quest for perfection. The rivalry began to escalate in 2009 when the Ravens lost to the Patriots 27–21 in a game that involved a confrontation between Patriots quarterback Tom Brady and Ravens linebacker Terrell Suggs. Both players would go on to take verbal shots at each other through the media after the game. The Ravens defeated the Patriots in the 2009 AFC Wild Card playoff game, 33–14, marking the first time the Ravens had ever defeated the Patriots. The Ravens faced the Patriots in week six of the 2010 season. The Patriots ended up winning 23–20 in overtime; the game caused controversy from a hit to the helmet of tight end Todd Heap by Patriots safety Brandon Meriweather.

The Ravens played the Patriots for the third consecutive season, this time in the 2011 AFC championship game, which the Patriots won, 23–20. The rivalry reached a new level of friction with this, the second playoff meeting between the two clubs. The Ravens built a 20–16 lead in the fourth quarter, but Patriots quarterback Tom Brady dove into the end zone to make the score 23–20 with around 11 minutes remaining; this proved to be the winning touchdown. On the Ravens' last possession of the game, quarterback Joe Flacco threw a pass to wide receiver Lee Evans in the corner of the end zone that would have given the Ravens the lead, but a last-second strip by Patriots corner Sterling Moore forced the ball from the hands of Evans, forcing the game to be decided on a last-minute field goal by Ravens kicker Billy Cundiff. With 11 seconds remaining on the clock, Cundiff missed the 32-yard field goal attempt, allowing the Patriots to kill the clock on their way to Super Bowl XLVI for a rematch with the New York Giants.

The Ravens' first regular-season win over the Patriots came on September 23, 2012.  The game was emotional as receiver Torrey Smith was competing following the death of his brother in a motorcycle accident just the night before. Smith caught two touchdowns in a back and forth game; the Ravens erased a 13–0 deficit in the first half and led 14–13, but the Patriots scored at the end of the second quarter for a 20–14 lead. The lead changed twice in the third quarter and the Patriots led 30–21 in the fourth, but the Ravens scored on Smith's second touchdown catch. The Ravens were stopped on fourth down but the Patriots had to punt; in the final two minutes a pass interference penalty on Devin McCourty put the ball at the Patriots 7-yard line; new Ravens kicker Justin Tucker booted a 27-yard field goal on the final play; the ball sailed directly over the upright and was ruled good; the quality of officiating by replacement referees caused controversy as Bill Belichick angrily reached for one of the referees as they were leaving the field, leading to a $50,000 fine later that week.

The two teams met again in the 2012 AFC Championship, where the Ravens won 28–13. The Patriots led at halftime, 13–7, but the Ravens defense gave up no points in the 2nd half. It was the first time ever that Tom Brady lost a game at home after leading at halftime, and the first time a road team beat the Patriots in the AFC Championship. This win propelled the Ravens to Super Bowl XLVII in which they beat the San Francisco 49ers for their second franchise Lombardi Trophy.

The two teams met once again in the Divisional playoffs on January 10, 2015 at Gillette Stadium. The Patriots trailed by as much as 14 twice, before beating the Ravens 35–31 to advance to the AFC Championship and eventually onto a 28–24 victory against the Seattle Seahawks in Super Bowl XLIX. 

On November 3, 2019, the 8–0 Patriots met the 5–2 Ravens at M&T Bank Stadium on Sunday Night Football. The game marked the introduction of Lamar Jackson in the rivalry, who took over as the Ravens quarterback in the middle of the 2018 season. The Ravens came away with a 37–20 victory, handing the Patriots their first loss of the season and beating them for the first time since the 2012 AFC Championship.

Rivalry statistics

Game results
Since 2007, only three games have been decided by more than 2 scores, a 2013 regular season 41–7 win for the Patriots, a 33–14 2009 AFC Wild Card playoff win for the Ravens, and a 2019 regular season 37–20 win for the Ravens. The Patriots currently lead the series 11–5.

|-
| 
| style="|Patriots  46–38
| Memorial Stadium
| Patriots  1–0
| First meeting in the series. Only meeting at Memorial Stadium. Patriots lose Super Bowl XXXI.
|-
| 
| style="|Patriots  20–3
| Foxboro Stadium
| Patriots  2–0
| Only meeting at Foxboro Stadium.
|-
| 
|style="|Patriots  24–3
| Gillette Stadium
| Patriots  3–0
| First start for Tom Brady in the series. Patriots win Super Bowl XXXIX.
|-
| 
|style="|Patriots  27–24
|M&T Bank Stadium
| Patriots  4–0
| Patriots complete 16–0 regular season. Patriots lose Super Bowl XLII.
|-
|  
|style="|Patriots  27–21
|Gillette Stadium
| Patriots  5–0
| Joe Flacco makes first start in the rivalry for the Ravens. First season the two teams have met in the rivalry where neither team reached the Super Bowl when Flacco or Brady starts as quarterbacks in the rivalry.
|-
! 2009 playoffs
! style="|Ravens  33–14
! Gillette Stadium
! Patriots  5–1
! AFC Wild Card playoffs. First Ravens victory in the series. Ravens jump out to 24–0 lead in the first quarter. Hand Tom Brady his first home postseason loss of his career and hand the Patriots their first home postseason loss since .
|-

|-
| 
| style="| Patriots  
| Gillette Stadium
| Patriots  6–1
| To date, the only overtime meeting in the series.
|-
! 2011 playoffs
! style="| Patriots  23–20
! Gillette Stadium
! Patriots  7–1
! AFC Championship Game. Patriots advance after Ravens' Lee Evans drops go-ahead TD and Billy Cundiff misses game-tying 32-yard FG. Patriots lose Super Bowl XLVI.
|-
| 
| style="| Ravens  31–30
| M&T Bank Stadium
| Patriots  7–2
| Ravens' first regular season victory in the series. Justin Tucker's 27-yard FG over the right upright wins the game for Baltimore.
|-
! 2012 playoffs
! style="| Ravens  28–13
! Gillette Stadium
! Patriots  7–3
! Second straight AFC Championship Game meeting. Ravens avenge their AFC Championship loss the previous season to New England. Hand Tom Brady his first ever home loss after leading at halftime (previously 67–0). Ravens win Super Bowl XLVII.
|-
| 
| style="| Patriots  41–7
| M&T Bank Stadium
| Patriots  8–3
| Largest margin of victory to date in the series at 34 points.
|-
! 2014 playoffs
! style="| Patriots  35–31
! Gillette Stadium
! Patriots  9–3
! AFC Divisional playoffs. Patriots overcome two separate 14–point deficits. Patriots controversially lined up receivers inside the tackle box during the game. Although deemed legal at the time, this tactic would later become illegal the next season. Patriots win Super Bowl XLIX.
|-
| 
| style="| Patriots  30–23
| Gillette Stadium
| Patriots  10–3
| Last start for Joe Flacco in the series. Patriots win Super Bowl LI.
|-
| 
| style="| Ravens  37–20
| M&T Bank Stadium
| Patriots  10–4
| Last start for Tom Brady in the series. First start for Lamar Jackson in series. 
|-

|-
| 
| style="| Patriots  23–17
| Gillette Stadium
| Patriots  11–4
| No spectators were present due to the COVID-19 pandemic.
|-
|
| style="| Ravens  37–26
| Gillette Stadium
| Patriots  11–5
| 
|- 
|-

|-
| Regular season
| style="|
| Patriots 6–1
| Patriots 3–2
| 
|-
| Postseason
| Tie 2–2
| Tie 2–2
| No games
| AFC Wild Card playoffs: 2009. AFC Divisional playoffs: 2014. AFC Championship Game: 2011–2012.
|-
| Regular and postseason 
| style="|
| Patriots 8–3
| Patriots 3–2
| 
|-

See also
 National Football League rivalries

Notes and references

National Football League rivalries
Baltimore Ravens
New England Patriots
New England Patriots rivalries
Baltimore Ravens rivalries